Ashina may refer to:
Ashina tribe, a ruling dynasty of the Turkic Khaganate
Ashina clan (Japan), one of the Japanese clans
Ashina District, Hiroshima, a former Japanese district
Empress Ashina (551–582), empress of the Chinese/Xianbei dynasty Northern Zhou
Sei Ashina (1983–2020), Japanese actress
Main setting of Sekiro: Shadows Die Twice

See also
Asena, a mythical female wolf found in old Turkic mythology
Ashna (disambiguation)